Social Distortion is an American punk rock band from Fullerton, California. Formed in late 1978, the group originally included Tom Corvin on vocals, Mike Ness on guitar, Mark Garrett on bass, and Casey Royer on drums. The band has since been through a number of lineup changes, and currently includes Ness on guitar and vocals, rhythm guitarist Jonny "2 Bags" Wickersham (since 2000), bassist Brent Harding (since 2005) and drummer David Hidalgo Jr. (since 2010).

History
Social Distortion was formed in 1978 by guitarist Mike Ness, bassist Mark Garrett, drummer Casey Royer and vocalist Tom Corvin. Garrett was eventually replaced by Rikk Agnew later that year. After roughly a year in the band, Corvin left and Ness assumed vocal duties while Agnew and Royer also left to play in a separate band named Social Distortion, which also included Garrett, before joining the Adolescents, when Ness brought in Dennis Danell to take over on guitar. When Social Distortion released its first single, Mainliner/Playpen in 1981, the group consisted of Ness on vocals and guitar, Dannell on Bass, and John "Carrot" Stevenson ond drums. Partway through 1981, Danell switched to rhythm guitar as Brent Liles took over on bass, joining alongside new drummer Derek O'Brien. The group released its debut album Mommy's Little Monster in 1983. During a show on New Year's Eve, both Liles and O'Brien left abruptly in response to Ness' heroin use. Early the next year, the departed members were replaced by John Maurer (bass) and Christopher Reece (drums). Bob Stubbs briefly served as drummer before Reece.

The band's lineup remained stable for ten years, producing three studio albums, before Reece left in October 1994 on amicable terms. He was initially replaced by Randy Carr, who lasted only until the following spring when he was fired on the recommendation of the band's producer Michael Beinhorn. Session drummer Deen Castronovo performed on the album, after which Chuck Biscuits joined the band as Carr's replacement. The band released Live at the Roxy in 1998, before taking a hiatus the following year as Ness released two solo albums and embarked on a promotional tour. On February 29, 2000, Danell died of a brain aneurysm. In June, Social Distortion returned with a new lineup including rhythm guitarist Jonny "2 Bags" Wickersham and drummer Charlie Quintana.

Shortly after recording the band's sixth studio album Sex, Love and Rock 'n' Roll, Maurer left Social Distortion to spend more time with his family. He was initially replaced by Rancid's Matt Freeman, although by January he had been replaced by Brent Harding, who had previously performed with Ness on his second solo album. In April 2009, Quintana announced his departure from Social Distortion, with Adam "Atom" Willard of Angels & Airwaves taking his place. Willard left again in March 2010, with Fu Manchu drummer Scott Reeder filling in for a South American tour. The group enlisted the services of Josh Freese for the 2011 album Hard Times and Nursery Rhymes, before David Hidalgo Jr. joined as the full-time replacement for Willard a few months later.

Members

Current

Former

Touring musicians

Touring substitutes

Timeline

Lineups

References

External links
Social Distortion official website

Social Distortion